4997 Ksana, provisional designation , is a carbonaceous Palladian asteroid from the outer region of the asteroid belt, approximately 10 kilometers in diameter. It was discovered on 6 October 1986, by Russian astronomer Lyudmila Karachkina at Crimean Astrophysical Observatory on the Crimean peninsula. The asteroid was named for Russian chemist Kseniya Nessler.

Orbit and classification 

Ksana is a small member of the Pallas family, a small asteroid family of carbonaceous B-type asteroids. It orbits the Sun in the outer main-belt at a distance of 1.9–3.8 AU once every 4 years and 10 months (1,778 days). Its orbit has an eccentricity of 0.33 and an inclination of 33° with respect to the ecliptic.
As no precoveries were taken, the asteroid's observation arc begins with its discovery observation in 1986.

Physical characteristics 

On the SMASS taxonomic scheme, Ksana is a B-type asteroid, which are primitive, volatile-rich asteroids. This also agrees with the overall spectral type of the Pallas family.

Diameter and albedo 

According to the surveys carried out by the Japanese Akari satellite and NASA's Wide-field Infrared Survey Explorer with its subsequent NEOWISE mission, Ksana measures between 7.36 and  kilometers in diameter and its surface has an albedo between 0.16 and 0.316.

The Collaborative Asteroid Lightcurve Link assumes a standard albedo for carbonaceous asteroids of 0.057 and calculates a larger diameter of 14.64 kilometers with an absolute magnitude of 12.9.

Rotation period 

In February 2007, a rotational lightcurve of Ksana was obtained from photometric observations by Italian astronomer Federico Manzini at the SAS observatory in Novara, Italy. It gave it a rotation period of  hours with a brightness variation of 0.21 in magnitude.

Naming 

This minor planet was named by the discoverer for his friend, the Russian chemist Kseniya Andreevna Nessler, who has been an advocate against environmental pollution. The asteroid's name "Ksana" is a variation of Kseniya (Ксения), the equivalent to the romanized Xenia. The official naming citation was published by the Minor Planet Center on 1 September 1993.

References

External links 
 Asteroid Lightcurve Database (LCDB), query form (info )
 Dictionary of Minor Planet Names, Google books
 Asteroids and comets rotation curves, CdR – Observatoire de Genève, Raoul Behrend
 Discovery Circumstances: Numbered Minor Planets (1)-(5000) – Minor Planet Center
 
 

004997
Discoveries by Lyudmila Karachkina
Named minor planets
004997
19861006